Cees Jan Hamelink (born 14 September 1940)  is a Dutch academic known for his work on communication, culture, and technology. He is emeritus professor of international communications and emeritus professor of media at the University of Amsterdam; professor in management information and knowledge at the University of Aruba; and professor of media, religion and culture at the Vrije Universiteit Amsterdam.

He was in a number of boards worldwide; chair of the Dutch League for Human Rights, chair of the Jan van Eyck Academie, honorary president of the International Association for Media and Communication Research and chair of Amsterdam World Jazz City 2014.

Hamelink wrote over seventeen books on communication, culture and technology. Best sellers include "The Technology Gamble", "The Politics of World Communication" and "The Ethics of Cyberspace". He is considered to be the first scholar outside of the United States to use and conceptualize the notion of information literacy in "An Alternative to News" (1976), a short text proposing a critical conception of literacy along the lines of Brazilian educator Paulo Freire.

Additionally, he is a passionate jazz musician. As a bassist he played in a trio with Louis van Dijk. Since 2008 he plays with Tamara Hoekwater in the Bourgondisch Combo, performing in the Netherlands and abroad. On 3 October 2014 they launched their CD I said yes in the Faculty Club of the University of Amsterdam.

Publications
 Global Communication, London, 2014 (ISBN 9781849204248)
 Media and Conflict, Escalating Evil, 2011 (ISBN 1594516448)
 Regeert de leugen?: mediaplichtigheid aan leugen en bedrog, Amsterdam, 2004 (ISBN 9789053529485)
 Human Rights for Communicators, 2003 (ISBN 9781572735682)
  De leugen regeert: over leugen en bedrog in de informatiesamenleving, tekst inaugurele rede Vrije Universiteit Amsterdam, 2002
 The Ethics of Cyberspace, Londen, 2000, vertaling van Digitaal fatsoen: mensenrechten in cyberspace uit 1999 (ISBN 9780761966685)
  Digitaal fatsoen: mensenrechten in cyberspace, Amsterdam, 1999
 The Politics of World Communication, 1994
  Internationale communicatie: arena van internationale conflicten, tekst inaugurele rede Universiteit van Amsterdam, 1984
  Informatie en macht: over de samenhang tussen de toegang tot informatie en de uitoefening van maatschappelijke macht, Baarn, 1984
  De computersamenleving, Baarn, 1980
  Derde wereld en culturele emancipatie, Baarn, 1978
  De mythe van de vrije informatie, Baarn, 1978
 Perspectives for public communication: a study of the churches' participation in public communication, proefschrift Universiteit van Amsterdam, Baarn, 1975

References

 prof. dr. C. Hamelink
 Curriculum Vitae prof. dr. C. Hamelink
 Publications at the National Library of the Netherlands
 WorldCat: auteur: Hamelink, Cees J.

1940 births
Living people
Communication scholars
Dutch jazz double-bassists
Dutch mass media scholars
Writers from Rotterdam
University of Amsterdam alumni
Academic staff of the University of Amsterdam
Academic staff of Vrije Universiteit Amsterdam
21st-century double-bassists
Musicians from Rotterdam